KC and the Sunshine Band is an American disco and funk band that was founded in 1973 in Hialeah, Florida. Their best-known songs include the hits "That's the Way (I Like It)", "(Shake, Shake, Shake) Shake Your Booty", "I'm Your Boogie Man", "Keep It Comin' Love", "Get Down Tonight", "Boogie Shoes", "Please Don't Go" and "Give It Up". The band took its name from lead vocalist Harry Wayne Casey's last name ('KC') and the 'Sunshine Band' from KC's home state of Florida, the Sunshine State. The group has had six top 10 singles, five number one singles and a number two single on the Billboard Hot 100 chart.

History

1970s
The band was formed in 1973 by Harry Wayne Casey (KC) and Richard Finch. Casey was a record store employee and part-timer at TK Records in Hialeah, Florida The band was originally called KC & The Sunshine Junkanoo Band because they used studio musicians from TK and a local Junkanoo band called the Miami Junkanoo Band. Meantime, Finch had been engineering records for TK, which is how the Casey-Finch musical collaboration began. They were soon joined by guitarist Jerome Smith and drummer Robert Johnson, both TK studio musicians.

The first few songs, "Blow Your Whistle" (September 1973) and "Sound Your Funky Horn" (February 1974), were released as singles, and did well enough on the U.S. R&B chart and overseas that TK wanted a follow-up single and album. In the meantime, while working on demos for KC & the Sunshine Band, the song "Rock Your Baby" (George McCrae) was created. Written by Casey and Finch, it featured Smith on guitar and became a number one hit in 51 countries in mid-1974. The band's "Queen of Clubs", which featured uncredited vocals by McCrae, was a hit in the UK, peaking at number 7, and they went on a tour there in 1975.

KC and other band members were frequent guests on WHYI-FM, branded as Y-100, one of southeast Florida's more powerful FM pop stations, that covered Dade and Broward Counties and beyond. This gave the band significant hometown exposure, during the rise of the disco genre in one of the music's epicenters.

With the release of the self-titled second album KC and the Sunshine Band in 1975 came the group's first major U.S. hit with "Get Down Tonight". It topped the R&B chart in April and hit number one on the Billboard Hot 100 in August. "That's the Way (I Like It)" also became a number one hit in November 1975 and the group received four nominations and one win at the 1976 Grammy Awards. The 1976 album Part 3 yielded two number one singles: "I'm Your Boogie Man" and "(Shake, Shake, Shake) Shake Your Booty". Another hit, "Keep It Comin' Love"(1977), peaked at number two. Their success lasted until the fifth album from 1979; their last chart topping hit was "Please Don't Go", hitting number one for one week in January 1980, and becoming the first number one hit of the 1980s. With the explosion of new wave music and the declining popularity of disco, the group explored other styles and changed labels, joining Epic Records in 1980 after TK Records went bankrupt.

With a change in styles, Casey enjoyed success, dueting with Teri DeSario with "Yes, I'm Ready", which hit No. 2 in March 1980; the adult contemporary sound was much different from his disco hits of the 1970s, and his first major success away from the Sunshine Band.

1980s
In 1981, the partnership between Finch and Casey came to an acrimonious end. Two years after the release of the previous album, the band released two albums with new material: The Painter (1981) and Space Cadet Solo Flight (1981). These albums generated little success, but in 1982, a hit track called "Give It Up" from the album All in a Night's Work (1982) brought a return to success in the UK, and appeared two years later in the U.S. Top 40. The song was also featured on the band's next album, 1984's KC Ten. Epic Records, however, refused to issue the song as a single due to its prior failure in the US. Because of this, a frustrated Casey formed Meca Records, releasing the single himself on this label in a final attempt to garner the song some success in America. It worked, but the album still failed to meet expectations. This led to the group falling into stasis around 1985 with Casey's retirement.

1990s
A revival of interest in disco music in 1991 brought Casey out of retirement. He reformed the band with some new members and two other original members, (the percussionist Fermin Goytisolo and vocalist Beverly Champion-Foster) and began touring once again. The new band has released a large number of compilation albums through Rhino Records, along with some newly recorded material. The album Oh Yeah! was released in 1993 after a ten-year gap between new albums (excluding compilations).

2000s and beyond

On July 28, 2000, guitarist Jerome Smith died accidentally while working as a bulldozer operator.

In 2001 and 2007, the band released the albums I'll Be There For You and Yummy. Both were composed of archived material recorded before their hiatus.

They appeared in the 2003 remake of the movie The In-Laws.

On July 6, 2013, KC and the Sunshine Band were honored with a Golden Palm Star on the Palm Springs Walk of Stars.

Discography

 Do It Good (1974)
 KC and the Sunshine Band (1975)
 The Sound of Sunshine (1975)
 Part 3 (1976)
 Who Do Ya (Love) (1978)
 Do You Wanna Go Party (1979)
 Space Cadet Solo Flight (1981)
 The Painter (1981)
 All in a Night's Work (1982)
 KC Ten (1983)
 Oh Yeah! (1993)
 I'll Be There for You (2001)
 Yummy (2007)
 Feeling You! The 60's (2015)
 A Sunshine Christmas (2015)

KC and Finch works 
Songwriter: H.W. Casey & Richard Finch
Rock Your Baby (1974) -  George McCrae, Pop #1
Dance Across the Floor (1978) - Jimmy "Bo" Horne
Get Happy (1978) - Jimmy "Bo" Horne
Gimme Some (1978) - Jimmy "Bo" Horne
I Wanna Go Home with You ((1978)  - Jimmy "Bo" Horne 
Don't Worry about It (1978) - Jimmy "Bo" Horne
It's Your Sweet Love (1978) - Jimmy "Bo" Horne
Let Me (1978) - Jimmy "Bo" Horne
Ask the Birds and the Bees (1978) - Jimmy "Bo" Horne
You Get Me Hot (1979) - Jimmy "Bo" Horne
Goin Home for Love(Foster/Casey/Finch/Horne) ((1979)  - Jimmy "Bo" Horne 
I Get Lifted (1979)  - Jimmy "Bo" Horne 
Without You (1979)  - Jimmy "Bo" Horne

References

External links

 
 
 Band history at ClassicBands.com
 KC and the Sunshine Band discography, album releases & credits at Discogs
 KC and the Sunshine Band albums to be listened as stream on Spotify
 Music Legends Part 1: KC & The Sunshine Band at www.TheStandardReport.com
 Interview on Yuzu Melodies

 
Musical groups established in 1973
American funk musical groups
Musical groups from Miami
American disco groups
Grammy Award winners
Epic Records artists
Jay Boy artists
RCA Victor artists
Sony BMG artists